Norman Murray Parker (born 28 August 1948) is a former New Zealand cricketer who played in three Test matches and one One Day International during 1976.

His highest first-class cricket score was 135 in his first game for Canterbury in 1973–74, in a team total of 225.

Beyond cricket
His brother John also played for New Zealand and was in the team with Murray for his four international matches. His son Mark was also a promising cricketer, but his professional career was cut short when he was killed in the 2002 Bali bombings.

Murray was a Science and Physical Education teacher at Timaru Boys' High School between 1971 and 2013.

References

External links 
 

1948 births
Living people
New Zealand Test cricketers
New Zealand One Day International cricketers
New Zealand cricketers
Canterbury cricketers
Otago cricketers
Cricketers from Dannevirke
University of Otago alumni
South Island cricketers